Oat mosaic virus (OMV) is a plant pathogenic virus of the family Potyviridae.

External links
ICTVdB—The Universal Virus Database: Oat mosaic virus
Family Groups—The Baltimore Method

Viral plant pathogens and diseases
Bymoviruses